The TW 3000 is a type of articulated light rail vehicle used on the Hanover Stadtbahn system since 2015. The trains are built by a consortium of Vossloh Kiepe and Alstom, with the final assembly taking place at HeiterBlicks Leipzig factory.

Technical specifications
The trains consist of two articulated sections, with steel car bodies and glass reinforced plastic front ends.

The interior features air-conditioning and lighting in variable color tones.

History
The first 50 sets were ordered in April 2011. Further 50 sets were ordered through an option in November 2013. First public trials with passengers were conducted on March 8, 2014. Entry into regular service had to be pushed back after faulty welds had been noticed on some of the sets. The trains entered regular service on March 15, 2015. 46 more sets were ordered in 2017.

References

External links

Üstra fleet information - TW 3000 

Tram vehicles of Germany
Transport in Hanover
600 V DC multiple units